Othman Masoud Othman Sharif is a Tanzanian lawyer and politician serving as the First Vice President of Zanzibar. He is also a party member of ACT Wazalendo.

References

Living people
Tanzanian Muslims
Vice presidents of Zanzibar
Government ministers of Zanzibar
Zanzibari politicians
University of Dar es Salaam alumni
Members of the Zanzibar House of Representatives
Alliance for Change and Transparency politicians
Year of birth missing (living people)